Hlobyne is a city in Poltava Oblast, Ukraine. It is the administrative center of Hlobyne Raion. Population:

History 

It was a village in Poltava Governorate of the Russian Empire.

During World War II it was occupied by German troops since September 1941 until September 1943. A Nazi concentration camp was established in the buildings of the local sugar factory.

It became an urban-type settlement in April 1957.

City since December 1976.

In January 1989 the population was 13 717 people.

In January 2013 the population was 10 043 people.

Other settlements in Hlobyne municipality
Village
 Dikovo (until 2009)

Gallery

References 

Cities in Poltava Oblast
Kremenchugsky Uyezd
Populated places established in 1976
Cities of district significance in Ukraine